Novenky is a rural locality (a khutor) in Akhtubinskoye Rural Settlement, Sredneakhtubinsky District, Volgograd Oblast, Russia. The population was 283 as of 2010. There are 18 streets.

Geography 
Novenky is located 9 km west of Srednyaya Akhtuba (the district's administrative centre) by road. Rybachy is the nearest rural locality.

References 

Rural localities in Sredneakhtubinsky District